Nedožery-Brezany is a village and municipality in Prievidza District in the Trenčín Region of western Slovakia.

History
The town was founded in 1964 following the unification of two existing municipalities Nedožery and Brezany. In historical records the village Nedožery was first mentioned in 1429. Brezany was mentioned in 1430.

Geography
The municipality lies at an altitude of 300 metres and covers an area of 24.164 km². It has a population of about 1940 people.

External links
 
 
http://www.statistics.sk/mosmis/eng/run.html

Villages and municipalities in Prievidza District